Prim Pujals Nolasco (born 26 July 1943) is a lawyer, judge, and politician from the Dominican Republic. He is Senator for the province of Samaná, elected in 2006, and re-elected in 2010.

Pujals is Juris Doctor.

On 29 December 2018, video footage of Pujals emerged on Dominican news media (and spread on social media) where he was seen loudly threatening a bystander who confronted him when he allegedly tried to cut in line at a local bank. Pujals can be heard threatening to kill the unnamed man, and calling him a derogatory racial slur.

References 

Living people
1943 births
People from Samaná Province
Social Christian Reformist Party politicians
Dominican Republic judges
20th-century Dominican Republic lawyers
Dominican Republic people of Catalan descent
Members of the Senate of the Dominican Republic
White Dominicans